Pēteris Dzelzītis (September 21, 1921 – February 16, 1948) was a Latvian soldier. He fought for the 19th Waffen Grenadier Division of the SS during World War II and the Latvian partisans during the Guerrilla war in the Baltic states.

Biography 
Pēteris Dzelzītis was born on September 21, 1921 near the village of Renda, in a family of farmers. He was educated in the Renda primary school. In 1943, Dzelzītis, along with his brother Vidvuds, was enlisted in the 19th Waffen Grenadier Division of the SS. Vidvuds was killed on March 17, 1944, during a battle on the eastern shore of the Velikaya River. The 19th Division gradually retreated to the region of Kurzeme, where they stayed until the war ended (the so-called Courland Pocket). Pēteris, along with some others, did not surrender to the Red Army and instead started guerrilla warfare. Their group consisted of seven men. Pēteris was its leader. He used codename "Kurmis" (Mole).

On February 2, 1948, the Soviets found the group's hiding place and raided it. Three of seven group members were killed in action, the other four, including Dzelzītis, were taken away for further questioning. The NKVD beat him up several times in an attempt to extract information, however, he did not reveal anything. He was executed on February 16.

Legacy 
He is considered to be a hero in Renda. In the early 1990s, not long after Latvia regained its independence, a commemorative plaque was attached to the Renda primary school. There was a movement which aimed to name a street in the nearby city of Kuldīga in memory of Dzelzītis, but it failed.

1921 births
1948 deaths
People from Kuldīga Municipality
Latvian partisans
Latvian torture victims
Latvian people executed by the Soviet Union
Deaths by firearm in the Soviet Union
Latvian Waffen-SS personnel
Executed Soviet collaborators with Nazi Germany